The 1943 All-Ireland Senior Hurling Championship Final was the 56th All-Ireland Final and the culmination of the 1943 All-Ireland Senior Hurling Championship, an inter-county hurling tournament for the top teams in Ireland. The match was held at Croke Park, Dublin, on 5 September 1943, between Cork and Antrim. The Ulster champions lost to their Munster opponents on a score line of 5-16 to 0-4.

Match details

1
All-Ireland Senior Hurling Championship Final
All-Ireland Senior Hurling Championship Finals
Antrim county hurling team matches
Cork county hurling team matches
All-Ireland Senior Hurling Championship Final
All-Ireland Senior Hurling Championship Final, 1943